Kambaa is a settlement in Githunguri constituency and Kiambu County Kenya's Central Province. It is an old town with pre-colonial history like the famous "Muito wa Lari" (Lari Massacre) as well as the Kenya's Multi party crisis in early 90's.

References 

Populated places in Central Province (Kenya)